The Girl in His Room is a 1922 American silent drama film directed by Edward José and starring Alice Calhoun, Warner Baxter and Eve Southern.

Cast
 Alice Calhoun as Myra Pendleton
 Warner Baxter as 	Kirk Waring
 Robert Anderson as Paul Duprez
 Faye O'Neill as Molly Maguire
 Eve Southern as Elinor Larrimore

References

Bibliography
 Connelly, Robert B. The Silents: Silent Feature Films, 1910-36, Volume 40, Issue 2. December Press, 1998.
 Munden, Kenneth White. The American Film Institute Catalog of Motion Pictures Produced in the United States, Part 1. University of California Press, 1997.

External links
 

1922 films
1922 drama films
1920s English-language films
American silent feature films
Silent American drama films
American black-and-white films
Films directed by Edward José
Vitagraph Studios films
1920s American films